Fernando Augusto Rodrigues de Araujo (born 25 July 1993), known as Fernando Augusto or Fernandinho, is a Brazilian professional footballer who plays as a defender for Uberaba.

Career

Augusto started his senior career with Corinthians. In 2018, he signed for Caldense in the Brazilian Campeonato Mineiro, where he made two league appearances and scored no goals. After that, he played for Araxá, Rio Preto, Moto Club, and Makedonija, where he plays as of 2019.

References

External links 
 Drinks, omelets and cigarettes: a Brazilian's adventure in Macedonia
 Fernando Augusto dreams of conquering the international market playing in Macedonia
 Fernandinho evaluates good start in the Macedonian League and projects the rest of the competition
 Fernandinho designs Macedonian League debut against Vardar and hopes the team will fight for a place in the Europa League
 “We are getting ready to put Caldense at the top of the table”, says lateral Fernandinho

1993 births
Living people
Brazilian footballers
Association football defenders
Brazilian expatriate footballers
Expatriate footballers in North Macedonia
FK Makedonija Gjorče Petrov players
Moto Club de São Luís players
Rio Preto Esporte Clube players
Associação Atlética Caldense players
FK Pelister players
União Recreativa dos Trabalhadores players
Sociedade Desportiva Juazeirense players
Associação Atlética Flamengo players
Sportspeople from Minas Gerais